Dreaming, Dreamin', or The Dreaming may refer to:

 Dreaming, experiencing a dream during sleep

Culture and religion 
 The Dreaming, a term for the religio-cultural worldview in Australian Aboriginal cultures
 Dreaming (Australian Aboriginal art), a term used for designs in contemporary indigenous Australian art

Film 
 Dreaming (1944 British film), a comedy film
 Dreaming (1944 German film), a historical musical drama film
 The Dreaming (film), a 1988 Australian horror film

Music

Bands 
 The Dreaming (American band), a 2001–2018 rock band from Hollywood
 The Dreaming (Scottish band), a 1990s Celtic rock band

Albums 
 [[Dreamin' (album)|Dreamin''' (album)]] by Liverpool Express, or the title song, 1978
 The Dreaming (album) by Kate Bush, or the title song (see below), 1982
  Dreaming #11, an EP by Joe Satriani, 1988
 Dreaming (album), by Grace Kelly, or the title song, 2005
 Dreaming, by Missing Persons, 2020
 The Dreaming (Monsta X album), 2021
 Dreaming (EP), by April, 2015
 [[Dreamin' (EP)|Dreamin' (EP)]], by Hockey Dad, 2014
 Dreaming: The Videos, a music video compilation by Crowded House, 2002

 Songs 
 "Dreaming" (Aurora song), 2002
 "Dreaming" (Blondie song), 1979
 "Dreamin (Cliff Richard song), 1980
 "Dreamin (Eddie Friel song), 1995
 "Dreaming" (I Dream song), from children's TV series I Dream, 2004
 "Dreamin (Johnny Burnette song), 1960
 "The Dreaming" (song), by Kate Bush, 1982
 "Dreamin (Loleatta Holloway song), 1977 
 "Dreaming" (M People song), 1999
 "Dreaming" (MN8 song), 1996
 "Dreaming" (Orchestral Manoeuvres in the Dark song), 1988
 "Dreaming" (Scribe song), 2004
 "Dreaming" (Smallpools song), 2013
 "Dreamin (Status Quo song), 1986
 "Dreamin (Vanessa Williams song), 1986
 "Dreamin (Weezer song), 2008
 "Dreamin (Will to Power song), 1987
 "Dreamin (Young Jeezy song), 2007
 "Dreamin, by Amos Lee from Amos Lee, 2005
 "Dreaming", by Beyoncé from 4, 2011
 "Dreamin, by Big K.R.I.T. from Return of 4Eva, 2011
 "Dreaming", by BT from Movement in Still Life, 1999
 "Dreaming", by Camouflage from Relocated, 2006
 "Dreaming", by Cream from Fresh Cream, 1966
 "Dreamin, by Fat Joe and Remy Ma from Plata O Plomo, 2017
 "Dreaming", by Fool's Garden from 25 Miles to Kissimmee, 2003
 "Dreaming", by Goldfrapp from Head First, 2010
 "Dreamin, by Kiss from Psycho Circus, 1998
 "Dreaming", by Mac DeMarco from 2, 2012
 "Dreaming", by Man Overboard from Hung Up on Nothing, 2008
 "Dreaming", by Men Without Hats from No Hats Beyond This Point, 2003
 "Dreamin, by Nipsey Hussle from The Marathon, 2010
 "Dreamin, by PnB Rock from TrapStar Turnt PopStar, 2019
 "Dreaming", by Pop Smoke from Meet the Woo 2, 2020
 "Dreamin, by Pras from Win Lose or Draw, 2005
 "Dreaming", by Ruff Driverz, 1998
 "Dreaming", by System of a Down from Hypnotize, 2005
 "Dreaming", by Yngwie Malmsteen from Odyssey, 1988
 "The Dreaming Song", by the Wiggles from Here Comes a Song, 1992

 Other media 
 Dreaming (journal), a peer-reviewed academic journal
 The Dreaming (comics), a fictional place in Neil Gaiman's The Sandman series, and a spin-off series of the same name
 The Dreaming (musical), a 2001 musical by Howard Goodall and Charles Hart
 The Dreaming (Tokyopop comic), an English-language manga by Queenie Chan
 The Dreaming, a fictional realm in the role-playing game Changeling: The Dreaming''

See also
 Dream (disambiguation)
 Dreamer (disambiguation)
 Dreaming Creek (disambiguation)
 Dreamtime (disambiguation)